Bahía de las Aguilas (literally "Eagles’ Bay"), is an  long beach along the southwestern coast of the Dominican Republic in the province of Pedernales near the southernmost part of the border with Haiti. The bay is part of the Jaragua National Park, and it is considered by many Dominicans (and visitors as well) as one of the most beautiful beaches in the world. The bay is a protected area as is the surrounding park, hence there is an abundance of sea life just feet off the beach within its waters.

Geography
The thing that visitors like the most about this beach, is that it is totally isolated. 323 km from Santo Domingo and approximately 25 km from Pedernales (the nearest town), this beach is a true oasis in the middle of the deserted steppe of the park. Departing from Pedernales, one gets to a small village called "La Cueva" (literally "The Cave") named so because of the numerous caves surrounding the village, where up until 2007, used to be occupied by local fishermen. La Cueva is located on a tip of land called Cabo Rojo  ( Red Cape/Point).  Here visitors can hire one of the local villagers to take them to the beach bordering the coast on a small motorboat, by foot or with an all-wheel-drive vehicle and a good driver going through the park itself (either way it is a 10- to 15-minute ride; 45 on foot).

Territory

There was a legal process as the territories on which Bahia de las Aguilas is located were supposed to be "acquired" by persons with political connections. That generated a lot of reactions from civil society as these acquisitions were attributed to corruption practices. Justice did prevail, and Bahia de las Aguilas was declared public land and is now a part of a wide scale plan for development by the Dominican Republic government.

Although Bahia de las Aguilas has caught the eye of major international hotel and resort chains like Marriott Group, which has 10 facilities throughout the Dominican Republic and 13 additional projects underway, President Luis Abinader has stated that no construction of any kind will be taking place in zones which are under environmental protection.

Flora and fauna 
Given Bahia de las Aguila's location within the Jaragua National Park, its coasts offer a subtropical climate and semi-arid terrain of bushes and shrubs to a range of diverse flora such as canelillas, raft trees, balsa palms, and even producing horned melon fruits. 

Among its most notable and endemic mammals are the pre-historic Hispaniolan Solenodons (Solenodon paradoxus), and the Hutia (Hutia conga), both endangered species, along with the likes of reptiles and amphibians: ricord iguanas, rhinoceros iguanas, and Hispaniolan sliders. 

There are also numerous bird species flying in the area like sooty terns, plain and white-crowned pigeons being the most abundant.

Marine ecosystem 
The Bahia de las Aguilas Caribbean sea floor is composed largely of uncontaminated coral reefs, and abundant sea grass prairies which serve as a key source of nutrients for legions of queen conch, Panulirus argus (spiny lobster), and even larger protagonists like the Antillean manatee.

Seeking refuge in its waters, endangered species of hawksbill turtles, leatherbacks, and green sea turtles rely on areas like Bahia de las Aguilas to reproduce and live free of illegal poaching.

Panoramic views

References

External links
http://www.diariolibre.com/cronologia/ver/meta/bahia-de-las-aguilas
http://www.listindiario.com/app/article.aspx?id=48661
http://www.grupojaragua.org.do/pnj.html#Comunidades%20Aleda%C3%B1as

Geography of Pedernales Province
Beaches of the Dominican Republic
Tourist attractions in Pedernales Province